Kariz (also Romanized as Karīz and Kerīz) is a village in Barrud Rural District, Kuhsorkh County, Razavi Khorasan Province, Iran. At the 2006 census, its population was 996, in 311 families.

References 

Populated places in Kuhsorkh County